Penhall may refer to:

Surname
 Bruce Penhall (born 1957), American professional motorcycle speedway racer; actor
 Darren Penhall (born 1972), English professional darts player
 Gertrude Penhall (1846–1929), American civic leader and clubwoman
 Joe Penhall (born 1967), English-Australian playwright and screenwriter
 William Penhall (1858–1882), English mountaineer